Perton is a hamlet in the English county of Herefordshire.

It is in the civil parish of Stoke Edith being west of the village of that name.

External links

Villages in Herefordshire